The 1984–85 Sporting de Gijón season was the 24th season of the club in La Liga, the 10th consecutive after its last promotion.

Squad

Competitions

La Liga

Results by round

League table

Matches

Copa del Rey

Matches

Copa de la Liga

Matches

Friendly tournaments

Trofeo Costa Verde

Ramón de Carranza Trophy

Squad statistics

Appearances and goals

|}

References

External links
Profile at BDFutbol
Official website

Sporting de Gijón seasons
Sporting de Gijon